The Ice Warriors is the partly missing third serial of the fifth season of the British science fiction television series Doctor Who, which was first broadcast in six weekly parts from 11 November to 16 December 1967.

In this serial, the Second Doctor (Patrick Troughton), Jamie McCrimmon (Frazer Hines) and Victoria Waterfield (Deborah Watling) arrive on Earth during a new ice age. After making their way into a base led by a man called Clent (Peter Barkworth), the crew discover a humanoid being in the ice that plots to revive its race and take over the planet. This serial marked the debut of the Ice Warriors.

It was the third incomplete Doctor Who serial to be released with full-length animated reconstructions of its two missing episodes.

Plot

In the distant future at Brittanicus Base, senior control technician Jan Garrett and her staff struggle to control an ioniser they are using to slow the progress of glaciers rolling over Great Britain. Leader Clent is convinced they can avert a new Ice Age, but the group knows they are only a few hours away from being forced to abandon the base. Tensions rise when Penley, a maverick scientist who has defected from the team, is mentioned. The remaining senior scientist, Arden, is on the glacier searching for archaeological finds, where he discovers an armoured man within a block of ice. Arden and his colleagues dig the ice man from the glacier. Two scavengers observe their actions: the anti-technology Storr and Penley, who live in the tundra. When one of Arden's team is killed in an avalanche, the other two return to base with the ice man. Storr too is injured in the avalanche.

The TARDIS arrives outside the base. The Second Doctor, Jamie and Victoria go inside, where the Doctor helps with the Ioniser. Arden and Walters reach the base with their discovery, and Arden sets up a device to melt the ice around the man. The Doctor examines the frozen man, and they determine that the "ice warrior" is an alien being. An emergency meeting distracts the staff; no one notices that the ice block has melted, with the creature showing signs of life. The creature revives, knocks Jamie unconscious, and takes Victoria hostage.

The ioniser planning meeting is interrupted when Jamie reports that the creature has taken Victoria. However, only Arden and Jamie can be spared for a search party. The creature identifies itself to Victoria as Varga, an Ice Warrior from the planet Mars, who has been frozen for millennia. He insists that Victoria help him find his ship and crew.

Penley goes to the base to steal medical supplies for Storr. He sees Varga and Victoria and follows them as they leave the Base. They encounter Clent, and Varga injures him badly. Penley tries to revive Clent and is found by the Doctor, who has worked out he is the errant scientist. While the Doctor aids Clent, Penley leaves the base.

In the glacier Varga finds four frozen comrades, revives them, and assigns them to create defenses and dig their craft out of the ice. Varga is observed by Penley, who is tracking in the snow having used the medicine on his friend Storr. When Penley returns to Storr, he is surprised to find a visitor, Miss Garrett, who implores him to rejoin the crew of the base.

Back at the base, Jamie and Arden are sent into the glacier, ostensibly to find the alien spacecraft rather than Victoria. They discover the Ice Warriors' cave excavation and report this to base.  They are then ambushed by the Ice Warriors and left for dead. Penley finds Arden dead, but Jamie alive. Penley takes him back to his home. Storr decides to speak to the Ice Warriors, convinced they might be allies.

Having failed to contact Arden, the base personnel assume something bad has happened. Moments later, the video link appears, operated by Victoria, who tells them of the danger of the Ice Warriors. An Ice Warrior, Turoc is sent to capture Victoria again and use her as bait. The Doctor decides to go to the spaceship and rescue Victoria. Before leaving, he takes a phial of ammonium sulphide, which he deduces will be noxious to the aliens. However, Victoria flees into the icy caves. When the Ice Warrior finds her, he is caught in an avalanche and crushed.

An examination of the engines of the Martian craft reveals them to be functional but low on fuel. When the Ice Warriors encounter Storr, they reject his offers of help. Storr is killed but Victoria, whom he brought from the ice caves, is permitted to live.

Penley finds the Doctor and takes him to Jamie. He determines that Jamie has temporary paralysis and heads to the Martian craft. He offers himself as an envoy, leaving his communicator active so Clent can hear, and is allowed to enter the airlock. With the glacier threatening to crush the spacecraft, the Doctor has Victoria released to him. Before Varga takes the communicator, the Doctor relays the message that Clent needs to use the Ioniser, regardless of consequences. The Doctor is marched to the core of the spacecraft, where he spots an ion propulsion system. Varga decides to attack the base and orders his Warriors to prepare a sonic cannon.

Penley brings Jamie to base on a motorised sled. Clent gives Penley a frosty reception, and they bicker. Clent says he has decided to use the Ioniser. Zondal has been given the task of arming the sonic cannon. The Doctor and Victoria release the chemical solution at Zondal, who collapses, but his hand activates the sonic cannon as he falls.

The sonic blast triggered by Zondal glances the base, causing minor damage. Varga uses the communicator to call Clent, threatening to fire again unless the humans surrender. Clent knows the base dome cannot survive another sonic blast and suggests a peace meeting between the two sides. The talks fail when a demented technician, Walters, tries to shoot the Martians. Varga dismantles the Ioniser reactor to get the mercury isotopes he needs for his ship. Without the ioniser, the glaciers move forward.

The Doctor and Victoria adjust the Martian sonic cannon so it will only harm the Ice Warriors. Penley alters the temperature and atmosphere controls in the base so it becomes uncomfortable for the Martians. The Doctor fires the sonic cannon, forcing Varga and his men to retreat from the base. He fuses the sonic cannon before he and Victoria flee the ship. The Doctor works with Penley to recalibrate the Ioniser. The computer calculates a fifty-percent chance that the Ioniser will explode when trained on a spacecraft with an ion engine; Penley tells Clent to work without the advice of the computer. When the computer overloads, Penley takes charge and starts the Ioniser.

The Martian craft begins to power up but is destroyed by the Ioniser. The ship explodes without starting a chain reaction, which solves the problem of the Ice Warriors and the glacier. The Doctor, Jamie and Victoria depart as green shoots emerge through the melting snow.

Production
Deborah Watling was unable to attend the complete recording of the final episode. Consequently, Victoria is asked (off-screen) to return to the TARDIS halfway through the episode.

Unusually, the word "episode" was dropped from each episode number in this serial. All save episodes 2 and 3 of The Ice Warriors exist in the BBC Archives. Episodes 1 and 4-6 were recovered in 1988 when they were found in Villiers House in Ealing. They were only found because everything was being cleared out while BBC Enterprises was in the process of moving out of the building.

Cast notes
Michael Attwell later played Bates in Attack of the Cybermen (1985). Angus Lennie subsequently appeared in Terror of the Zygons (1975).

Broadcast and reception

 Episode is missing

The Ice Warriors has received generally favourable reviews, with some criticism aimed at its length and plot. Paul Cornell, Martin Day, and Keith Topping gave the serial a favourable review in The Discontinuity Guide (1995), writing, "A great minimalist tundra landscape, fine performances from Peter Barkworth and Peter Sallis, and the eerie hissing voices of the Ice Warriors themselves, help turn a standard 'don't trust the machines' storyline into something special." In The Television Companion (1998), David J. Howe and Stephen James Walker praised the Ice Warriors' technical achievements and the "excellent" guest cast, writing that there was "very little to fault". They noted that the story "fails to give the viewer any real sense of where all the various settings are in relation to one other", but said that it was "a minor irritation". In 2009, Patrick Mulkern of Radio Times praised Bernard Bresslaw as Varga as well as the regular cast. While he was positive towards the scientific dialogue, he felt that the message about the computer was less effective today, and called the climax "disappointingly shambolic". Reviewing the DVD release in 2013, SFX reviewer Ian Berriman gave the story three out of five stars. He called it a "success" despite "boring/bewildering story elements", concerning how Clent spends six episodes deliberating and "flawed" motives and reasoning behind the Ice Warriors' plan. John Sinnott of DVD Talk said the story was "a fun, if a little overly long, adventure" with a "slow and plodding" story.  Sinnott praised Troughton's performance and found the sets impressive.  The animated episodes were not considered to be particularly accomplished: "There wasn't a huge budget allocated for the project, and it shows unfortunately. The animated characters don't move smoothly, they have a tendency to bob around when walking and are pretty stiff in general. They reminded me of puppets, and move rather like the characters in Thunderbirds."

The programming committee of the public German TV broadcaster ZDF refused unanimously to buy the series after watching The Ice Warriors for a test. Reasons given included starry-eyed decoration and costumes as well as obscure scripts. Subsequently Doctor Who remained relatively unknown in German-speaking countries.

Commercial releases

In print

In March 1976, Target Books published a novelisation by Brian Hayles of this serial with a cover illustration by Chris Achilleos. In the book, Hayles named the computer system ECCO.

Home media
A VHS was released in 1998, which also included Doctor Who: The Missing Years (see Lost in Time) documentary. It included an audio CD featuring the full-length soundtracks of missing episodes Two and Three which were covered on the VHS by an abridged Tele-snaps/soundtrack reconstruction. A two-disc CD set from BBC Audiobooks features the soundtrack from the television serial, with the addition of narration by Frazer Hines. The recordings include an interview with Frazer Hines, as well as the soundtrack from the BBC's televised trailer for the next serial, The Enemy of the World. An unabridged reading of the Target novelisation was released in 2010 by BBC Audiobooks, again read by Hines. On 13 June 2021, the soundtrack with the Hines narration was released on vinyl by Demon Records.

The serial was released on DVD on 26 August 2013, with parts 2 and 3 being presented in animated form, with Qurios Entertainment providing the animation. The abridged reconstruction from the 1998 VHS release was also included as part of the Special Features.

References

External links

Photonovel of The Ice Warriors on the BBC website

Target novelisation

Second Doctor serials
Doctor Who missing episodes
Doctor Who stories set on Earth
Mars in television
1967 British television episodes
Doctor Who serials novelised by Brian Hayles
Doctor Who serials written by Brian Hayles
Fiction set in the 6th millennium